The Last Goodbye or Last Goodbye may refer to:

Music
Last Goodbye (Single), a 2022 single by STR8
The Last Goodbye (album), a 2022 album by Odesza
The Last Goodbye, a 2004 album by Edison
"The Last Goodbye" (Atomic Kitten song), 2002
"The Last Goodbye" (David Cook song), 2011
"The Last Goodbye" (Steve Harley & Cockney Rebel song)), 2006
"Last Goodbye" (Jeff Buckley song), 1994
"Last Goodbye" (Da Buzz song), 2006, also album title
"El Ultimo Adios (The Last Goodbye)", 2001 charity single
"The Last Goodbye", a 1968 single by Chris Farlowe
"The Last Goodbye", a song by Haste the Day from Burning Bridges
"The Last Goodbye", a song by James Morrison from Undiscovered
"The Last Goodbye", a song by Paulina Rubio from Border Girl
"The Last Goodbye", a song by Lara Fabian from A Wonderful Life
"The Last Goodbye", a song by Black Label Society from Shot to Hell
"The Last Goodbye", a song by Agent Orange from Living in Darkness
"The Last Goodbye", a song by Billy Boyd from the soundtrack of The Hobbit: The Battle of the Five Armies
"Last Goodbye (오랜 날 오랜 밤)", a song by Akdong Musician from Winter
"Last Goodbye", a song by Clean Bandit from What Is Love?
"Last Goodbye", a song by Logan from First Leaf Fallen
"Last Goodbye", a song by Union J from Union J
"Last Goodbye", a song by Kesha from Warrior
"Last Goodbye", a track from the soundtrack of the 2015 video game Undertale by Toby Fox

Other uses
"The Last Goodbye", an episode of the television series The Dead Zone

 The Last Goodbye, a 2017 virtual reality film about that follows Holocaust survivor Pinchas Gutter’s visit to the Majdanek concentration camp